The 1938 New Hampshire gubernatorial election was held on November 8, 1938. Incumbent Republican Francis P. Murphy defeated Democratic nominee John L. Sullivan with 57.08% of the vote.

Primary elections
Primary elections were held on September 13, 1938.

Republican primary

Candidates
Francis P. Murphy, incumbent Governor
Thomas P. Cheney, New Hampshire Attorney General

Results

General election

Candidates
Major party candidates
Francis P. Murphy, Republican
John L. Sullivan, Democratic

Other candidates
Elba K. Chase, Communist

Results

References

1938
New Hampshire
Gubernatorial